The 1960–61 Duke Blue Devils men's basketball team represented Duke University in the 1960–61 NCAA University Division men's basketball season. The head coach was Vic Bubas and the team finished the season with an overall record of 22–6.

Rankings

References 

Duke Blue Devils men's basketball seasons
Duke
1960 in sports in North Carolina
1961 in sports in North Carolina